The IBM HPC Systems Scientific Computing User Group (ScicomP) is an international organization open to all scientific and technical users of IBM systems. At yearly meetings application scientists and staff from HPC centers present talks about, and discuss, ways to develop efficient and scalable scientific applications. These meetings provide an opportunity to give feedback to IBM that will influence the design of future systems. ScicomP is a not-for-profit group and is not affiliated with IBM Corporation.

History 

ScicomP was formed in October 1999 when 285 researchers and engineers met at IBM's Advanced Computing Technology Center (ACTC) at IBM Research in Yorktown Heights, NY.
The meeting was a user-oriented and planned 3-day workshop to share information on scientific computing techniques for the users of IBM SP supercomputers. The meeting was created on the recommendations of the attendees of the IBM SP Scientific Applications Development and Optimization Workshop held in March 1999 at the San Diego Supercomputer Center. The objective of that meeting was to help computational scientists and engineers develop applications that achieve maximum performance and scalability on the IBM SP systems.

ScicomP has held annual and semi-annual meetings that bring together scientific domain experts, computational
scientists, systems engineers, and IBM technical specialists to share experiences using IBM High Performance
Computing Systems. The domain encompasses all IBM HPC Systems, including Power, Blue Gene, Cell,
hybrid (e.g. the Los Alamos RoadRunner system), and blade architectures.

The meetings alternate between supercomputing sites in North America and Europe. The next meeting will be held in May 2009 at the Barcelona Supercomputing Center in Barcelona, Spain.

External links 
 ScicomP Home Page
 IBM Advanced Computing Technology Center
 IBM Website

IBM user groups

User groups